Nonexistent is the sophomore album of the extreme metal band Living Sacrifice. The album was released through R.E.X. Records in 1992. The album was recorded quickly after the debut self-titled album in Nashville, Tennessee and produced by Doug Mann. The album is a notable change for the band, as the debut focused more on a thrash metal sound, while the follow up has a heavy emphasis on death metal, drawing more from artists such as Gorguts or Obituary.

History
The album was recorded in Nashville, Tennessee a short time after the release of their self-titled debut album in 1991. The band began their recording with Doug Mann and engineer Martin Woodlee. The band originally hoped to have Scott Burns (Death, Sepultura, Cannibal Corpse) produce the album, with interest on both sides as the self-titled was on his top albums of 1991. However, the label requested the album be done sooner, which Burns could not due to scheduling. Martin Woodlee was hired as an engineer instead, which the band has been vocally upset with. According to the members of the band, he was unaware of how to produce the style they were attempting to produce. The band eventually asked him to step aside from the recording process, with DJ Johnson and Lance Garvin managing the mixing and EQ for the album.

In 2022, a remaster and remix was released on the 30th anniversary of the album, to remedy the issues the band had with the production. The remaster and remix was produced by Jeremiah Scott who produced The Infinite Order and Ghost Thief.

Critical Reception 
The album received similar reviews throughout the metal community. AllMusic.com wrote "While the term Christian death metal seems like one of music's most comical oxymorons, Living Sacrifice does a decent job proving that the band deserves respect on this, one of its heaviest recordings.", giving the release a 3 out of 5 star review.

Jesus Freak Hideout gave the album a 3 of 5 review, remarking that "All in all, Nonexistent is worth your time. The music is good and so is the message. Sure, the vocals can get irritating, but it's comfortable to know that even though sometimes you don't know what is being said, God does and He is being praised."

Encyclopedia Metallum gave 3 separate reviews giving ratings of 65-99%, making it very split from the fans. One said "This album is an excellent piece of death metal, but the production is good and horrible.", the second review stated "This is a borderline solid/crap album from an interesting band, it’s a shame quite a few of its elements are out of place on this album or else it would have scored in the upper 80’s so it will receive a 65% instead.", while the final stated "...Nonetheless, this is some serious class-act pummeling, and the lack of bass is hardly a problem. “Nonexistent” should not be overlooked as it is definitely a great album.".

Track listing

Personnel
Living Sacrifice
 Darren "D.J." Johnson - Vocals, Bass
 Jason Truby - Lead Guitars
 Bruce Fitzhugh - Rhythm Guitars
 Lance Garvin - Drums

Production
 Thomas "Lark" Wolfe - Sleeve Design
 Martin Woodlee - Engineer
 Doug "Psychoboy" Mann - Producer, Executive Producer
 P. Gavin Morkel - Executive Producer
 Scott Albert (Circle of Dust, Celldweller) - arrangements and programming on "Emerge"

References

Living Sacrifice albums
1992 albums
Solid State Records albums
R.E.X. Records albums